Corrado Mario Colombo (born 3 August 1979) is an Italian footballer. He currently plays for Tuttocuoio as a striker.

Club career

Atalanta, Inter and loans
Colombo started his career at the famous youth rank of Atalanta. He made his debut on Serie B and for the club in 1998–99 season, and then joined Pistoiese (Serie B). He was signed by the giant Internazionale in the summer of 2000 in co-ownership deal. He made his Serie A debut on 1 October 2000 against Reggina Calcio, and four other appearances at Coppa Italia, Italian Super Cup and the UEFA Cup match, in which he scored.

In October, he was on loan to Torino Calcio (Serie B) along with Sixto Peralta, due to there being too many strikers on the squad.

He failed to return to Inter, but was sold back to Atalanta, this time in the Serie A.

His first ever Serie A season as regular was fair, in which he made 22 appearances.

Sampdoria and loans
In summer 2002, Sampdoria (Serie B) signed Colombo in a co-ownership deal, for 5.25 billion lire (€2,711,399). He is one of the players who helped the club to be promoted, by playing 27 games.

But his third Serie A season with his third Serie A club was bitter, he made just 2 appearances before the winter break.

Colombo was loaned to Piacenza (Serie B), Livorno (Serie A) and Ascoli (Serie A), for exactly two seasons. The latter two were newcomers to the Serie A at that time, and Piacenza was also new to Serie B since being relegated.

He returned to Sampdoria in January 2006, due to injuries of Emiliano Bonazzoli, when he made 12 appearances, without a goal.

Brescia, Spezia and Pisa
In June 2006, Atalanta gave up the remain registration rights of Colombo to Sampdoria for free, while the "Blue-Black" also forced to sell Biagio Pagano to Sampdoria after no agreement was formed and a lower bid thereafter . But it saw Colombo sent to Brescia (Serie B) in a co-ownership deal on 29 August 2006, for a peppercorn fee of €500. Likes previous times, he failed to score regularly.

On 29 January 2007, Spezia (Serie B) signed Colombo, from Brescia, with Sampdoria retained 50% registration rights, as an emergency signing. He finally scored regularly, scoring 8 goals in 18 games, which kept the place of Serie B for Spezia.

He then transferred to Pisa Calcio in January 2008. Pisa paid €200,000 to Spezia to acquire its portion of registration rights. In June 2008 Sampdoria gave up the remain 50% registration rights to Pisa for free.

Bari, Verona and Spezia
On 1 September 2008, he was signed by Bari in 2-year contract. On 31 August 2009, he signed a 2-year contract with Verona, after rule out from Bari first team. In August 2010 Colombo was released. Two days later Colombo was re-signed by Spezia.

Serie D
On 25 August 2011 Colombo was signed by Serie D club U.S. Pistoiese 1921. However, after only 1 goal in 7 games, he was released.

International career
Colombo was a member of the Italy national under-21 football team.

Career statistics

Club 

1Include one match at 2000 Supercoppa Italiana.
2Include one match at Relegation play-off.
3Include two matches and one goals at Relegation play-off
4All in 2009–10 Coppa Italia Lega Pro
5Include four matches in Promotion play-off

Honours
Inter
Supercoppa Italiana (Runner-up): 2000

Torino
Serie B: 2000–01

Bari
Serie B: 2008–09

References

External links
 Profile at Football.it 
 archivio.inter.it
 National team Statistics at FIGC 

1979 births
Living people
People from Vimercate
Italian footballers
Italy under-21 international footballers
Atalanta B.C. players
Inter Milan players
Torino F.C. players
Piacenza Calcio 1919 players
U.C. Sampdoria players
U.S. Livorno 1915 players
Ascoli Calcio 1898 F.C. players
Brescia Calcio players
Spezia Calcio players
U.S. Pistoiese 1921 players
S.S.C. Bari players
Pisa S.C. players
Hellas Verona F.C. players
A.C. Tuttocuoio 1957 San Miniato players
Serie A players
Serie B players
Serie C players
Serie D players
Association football forwards
Footballers from Lombardy
Sportspeople from the Province of Monza e Brianza